Nebria purpurata is a species of black coloured ground beetle from the Nebriinae subfamily that is endemic to the US state of Colorado.

References

purpurata
Beetles described in 1878
Beetles of North America
Endemic fauna of Colorado